Shishir Gupta is Executive Editor of the Hindustan Times. He is author of The Himalayan Face-off : Chinese Assertion and Indian Riposte, published by Hachette (India) in March 2014. The book deals with the threat from Beijing to New Delhi and the emerging tussle between an aspiring global power and an rising one. The book was described as "must read" by former Indian Finance Minister P Chidambaram and "deeply insightful" by present Indian Finance, Defence and Corporate Affairs Minister Arun Jaitley.

Gupta is also the author of the book The Indian Mujahideen : The Enemy Within, published by Hachette in July 2011. The book was jointly launched by then Finance Minister P Chidambaram and Leader of Opposition in Rajya Sabha Arun Jaitley. The book is the first insight into indigenous Islamic jihad in India and rising radicalization in the country. 

He joined the Hindustan Times for special stories in August 2011 after eight years with The Indian Express as editor, Express News Service and national bureau chief. He has covered national politics, strategic affairs including wars, insurgencies, terrorism, intelligence, defence and diplomacy. Gupta is a journalist, writer and columnist with the Hindustan Times and used to write a weekly blog "Inside Story" on the Hindustan Times website.

Prior to The Indian Express, he  worked with India Today magazine as senior assistant editor and special correspondent with the Hindustan Times. Shishir wrote a paper on election funding in India during his term as a press fellow at Wolfson College, Cambridge, UK, in 1998 and studied investigative journalism in the US in 2006. Winner of the 2011 Ben-Gurion Award for journalism, he was also a member of the International Institute of Strategic Studies, London.

References

Further reading 
http://www.dnaindia.com/lifestyle/report_mumbai-blasts-azamgarh-the-jihadist-factory_1565873
https://web.archive.org/web/20110718103002/http://www.hindustantimes.com/Five-years-and-counting/Article1-721664.aspx

https://web.archive.org/web/20110722085558/http://books.hindustantimes.com/2011/07/review-indian-mujahideen-the-enemy-within/
http://www.indianexpress.com/columnist/shishir-gupta/
http://www.indianexpress.com/Blog-IE/author/shishir%20gupta:%20the%20inside%20story/
http://www.tehelka.com/story_main50.asp?filename=hu030911Attack.asp
https://web.archive.org/web/20120226213029/http://www.hindustantimes.com/News-Feed/ColumnsOthers/Self-interest-must-guide-our-actions/Article1-814886.aspx
https://web.archive.org/web/20111216213208/http://www.hindustantimes.com/News-Feed/Columns/Target-for-terror/Article1-742430.aspx
http://www.indianexpress.com/news/tajik-air-base-is-ready-gives-india-its-first-footprint-in-strategic-central-asia/24207/
http://www.moneylife.in/article/indian-mujahideen-the-terror-inside/19418.html
http://www.ndtv.com/article/india/chidambaram-compares-right-wing-terror-to-indian-mujahideen-simi-124117
http://www.financialexpress.com/news/tracking-terrorists/834772/
http://www.businessindiagroup.com/issueprevious/872%20Books.pdf
http://www.thehindu.com/books/books-reviews/indias-himalayan-china-ignorance/article5979261.ece
https://web.archive.org/web/20140528115749/http://www.hindustantimes.com/lifestyle/books/the-zero-sum-giants/article1-1217717.aspx

Indian newspaper editors
Living people
Year of birth missing (living people)